is a railway station on the Seibu Ikebukuro Line in Nerima, Tokyo, Japan, operated by the private railway operator Seibu Railway.

Lines
Only all-stations "Local" services stop at this station.

Station layout
Fujimidai Station consists of an elevated island platform serving two tracks, with an additional outer track on either side for non-stop services.

Platforms

History
The station opened on 15 March 1925, originally named . It was renamed Fujimidai on 1 March 1933.

Station numbering was introduced on all Seibu Railway lines during fiscal 2012, with Fujimidai Station becoming "SI08".

Passenger statistics
In fiscal 2013, the station was the 42nd busiest on the Seibu network with an average of 24,967 passengers daily.

The passenger figures for previous years are as shown below.

References

External links

 Fujimidai Station information (Seibu Railway) 

Railway stations in Japan opened in 1925
Seibu Ikebukuro Line
Railway stations in Tokyo